Om Prakash Sharma (born 20 March 1953) is an Indian politician and is an MLA from Vishwas Nagar in Delhi.

Sharma generally known by the name OP Sharma is a leader of the Bharatiya Janata Party and a member of the Delhi Legislative Assembly. He is one of three MLAs from the BJP in the Delhi Legislative Assembly Election 2015. He was the only BJP MLA who was able to retain his seat from 2013 Election from Vishwasnagar constituency beating his nearest candidate, Atul Gupta(AAP), by a margin of 15,000 votes.

He was born in the staff quarters of corporation employees at Kashmere Gate. Sharma's father was working in the Municipal Corporation of Delhi. The eldest of three sons, Sharma graduated from Satyawati College where he was college president. He also contested the Delhi University students’ union election and was an executive member of the team which Mr. Arun Jaitley headed as president. He started his political career from Delhi University. Then he worked as an employee of the municipal corporation. After his father died, he became an inspector in the house tax department. He quit the job within a year and started taking care of sweets shops his family owns. Now he is well known Politician in Bharatiya Janata Party, Delhi. One of his sons, Rohit Kumar Mehraulia, is also a politician.

Controversies and legal cases  
In the year of 2016, OP Sharma was suspended from 2 sessions due to his use of certain derogatory remarks against AAP's Chandni Chowk MLA Alka Lamba. He was also arrested following an attack on a CPI leader and journalists outside Patiala House Courts where Kanhaiya Kumar the former JNUSU president was being produced.

On 9 January 2017, Sharma's office in Karkarduma in east Delhi was burgled, days after Deputy Chief Minister Manish Sisodia's office located around the same area was broken into. A computer, LCD TV, DVRs from CCTV cameras, and files were stolen from Sharma's office, the same items that were stolen in the Sisodia burglary.

Electoral performance

References 
 

1953 births
Bharatiya Janata Party politicians from Delhi
Delhi MLAs 2013–2015
Delhi MLAs 2015–2020
Delhi MLAs 2020–2025
Living people
Place of birth missing (living people)